Acianthera tokachii is a species of orchid plant native to Peru.

References 

tokachii
Flora of Peru